Ayahualulco is a municipality in Veracruz, Mexico. It is located about 80 km from state capital Xalapa. It has a surface of 148.06 km2.

The municipality of Ayahualulco is delimited to the north by Perote, to the north-east by Xico, to the east by Ixhuacán de los Reyes and to the south by Puebla.

It produces principally maize and potatoes.

In Ayahualulco, in June takes place the celebration in honor to San Juan Bautista, Patron of the town.

References

External links 

  Municipal Official Site
  Municipal Official Information

Municipalities of Veracruz